Tramways are lightly laid industrial railways, often not intended to be permanent. Originally, rolling stock could be pushed by humans, pulled by animals (especially horses and mules), cable-hauled by a stationary engine, or pulled by small, light locomotives. Because individual tramway infrastructure is not intended to carry the weight of typical standard-gauge railway equipment, the tramways over which they operate may be built from less substantial materials. Tramways can exist in many forms; sometimes simply tracks temporarily placed on the ground to transport materials around a factory, mine or quarry.  Many, if not most, use narrow-gauge railway technology. 

The term "tramway" is not in use in North America but is commonly used in the United Kingdom and elsewhere where British railway terminology and practices influenced management practices, terminologies and railway cultures, such as Australia, New Zealand, and those parts of Asia, Africa and South America that consulted with British engineers when undergoing modernization. In New Zealand, they are commonly known as "bush tramways" and are often not intended to be permanent. In Australia the term is widely used in Queensland, where there are several thousand kilometres of sugar-cane tramways. Passengers generally are not conveyed on tramways, although employees would often use them, either officially or unofficially.

History

The term was originally applied to wagons running on primitive tracks in mediaeval Great Britain and Europe. The name seems to date from about 1517 and to be derived from an English dialect word for the shaft of a wheelbarrow—in turn from Low German , meaning a beam.

The tracks themselves were sometimes known as gangways, dating from before the 12th century, being usually simply planks laid upon the ground literally "going road". In south Wales and Somerset the term "dramway" is also used, with vehicles being called drams.

An alternative term, "wagonway" (and wainway or waggonway), originally consisted of horses, equipment and tracks used for hauling wagons.

Usually the wheels would be guided along grooves. In time, to combat wear, the timber would be reinforced with an iron strip covering. This developed to use "L"-shaped steel plates, the track then being known as a plateway.

An alternative appeared in 1789, the so-called "edge-rail", which allowed wagons to be guided by having the wheels flanged instead of running, flangeless, in grooves. Since these rails were raised above the ground they were less likely to be blocked by debris, but they obstructed other traffic, and the wagons could not be used beyond the limits of the rails – whereas plateways had the advantage that trucks with unflanged wheels could be wheeled freely on wharves and in factories. Edge rails were the forerunners of the modern railway track.

These early lines were built to transport minerals from quarries and mines to canal wharves. From about 1830, more extensive trunk railways appeared, becoming faster, heavier and more sophisticated and, for safety reasons, the requirements placed on them by Parliament became more and more stringent. See rail tracks.

These restrictions were excessive for the small mineral lines and it became possible in the United Kingdom for them to be categorised as Light railways subject to certain provisos laid down by the Light Railways Act 1896.

Meanwhile, in the United Kingdom the term tramway became the term for passenger vehicles (a tram) that ran on tracks in the public highway, sharing with other road users.  Initially horse-drawn, they were developed to use electric power from an overhead line. A development of the tramway in the United Kingdom dispensed with tracks, but retained electric power from overhead wires; it was the trolleybus.

In 2000 the CarGoTram began operating as a cargo tram for the Volkswagen factory in Dresden, Germany.

See also

 Barlow rail
 British narrow gauge railways
 Broome Tramway
 Decauville
 Forest railway
 Iron rails
 Mine railway
 Narrow-gauge railways in Australia
 Plateway
 Rail profile
 Tramway track
 List of tramways in Queensland

References

Industrial railways
Tram transport